Heart and Soul is a 1917 American silent drama film directed by J. Gordon Edwards and starring Theda Bara. The film was based on the 1887 novel Jess by H. Rider Haggard and shot at the Fox Studio in Fort Lee, New Jersey. This film is now considered a lost film.

Cast
 Theda Bara as Jess
 Edwin Holt as John Croft
 Claire Whitney as Bess
 Walter Law as Drummond
 Harry Hilliard as John Neil
 Glen White as Pedro
 Alice Gale as Mammy
 John Webb Dillion as Sancho
 Margaret Laird
 Kittens Reichert as Bess (in prologue)
 Margaret Lairce as Jess (in prologue)
 Art Acord as Undetermined Role (uncredited)

See also
List of lost films
1937 Fox vault fire

References

External links

1917 films
1917 drama films
1917 lost films
Fox Film films
Silent American drama films
American silent feature films
American black-and-white films
Films based on British novels
Films directed by J. Gordon Edwards
Films shot in Fort Lee, New Jersey
Films based on works by H. Rider Haggard
Lost American films
Lost drama films
1910s American films
1910s English-language films